Alexander Dreymon (born Alexander Doetsch; 7 February 1983) is a German actor. He is best known for portraying Uhtred of Bebbanburg in the television series The Last Kingdom (2015–2022). Dreymon's other notable roles were in Christopher and His Kind (2011) and American Horror Story: Coven (2013–2014). Dreymon also appeared in the 2011 World War II film Resistance. He is fluent in German, English, and French.

Early life
Dreymon was born Alexander Doetsch in Germany, and grew up in the United States, France, and Switzerland.

Dreymon grew up always wanting to be an actor. He has a background in martial arts and learned to ride horses while living in South Dakota. He studied in Paris, then trained for three years at Drama Centre London.

Career
After training for three years at Drama Centre London, Dreymon appeared on stage in London and Paris before making his screen debut in the French one-off-drama Ni reprise, ni échangée, and later played alongside Doctor Who’s Matt Smith in the British movie Christopher and His Kind.[3]

Dreymon worked on several independent films in the US as well as portraying Luke Ramsey in five episodes of American Horror Storys third season, Coven.

Dreymon portrays Uhtred of Bebbanburg in the television Series The Last Kingdom on Netflix. He also directed the second episode of the fifth season.

Personal life
In late 2019, Dreymon began dating actress Allison Williams. They met while filming Horizon Line. In late 2021, they had a son.

Filmography

Film

Television

References

External links
 
Alexander Dreymon - Instagram

20th-century German male actors
21st-century German male actors
German male film actors
Alumni of the Drama Centre London
1983 births
Living people